Arthur Robert "Bob" Dummett (3 October 1935 – 13 April 1994) was an Australian rules footballer who played in the Victorian Football League (VFL) between 1954 and 1961 for the Richmond Football Club.

Family
The son of Victorian cricketer Arthur Dummett (1900-1968), he was the nephew of Collingwood footballers Alf Dummett and Charlie Dummett.

He married Barbara Faith Cain on 6 October 1956.

Footnotes

References
 Hogan P: The Tigers Of Old, Richmond FC, Melbourne 1996

External links
 
 
 Boyles Football Photos: Bob Dummett.

Richmond Football Club players
Australian rules footballers from Melbourne
1935 births
1994 deaths